Christopher Garnett OBE is a member of the Board of the Olympic Delivery Authority, and was the Chief Executive Officer of Great North Eastern Railway and simultaneously Senior Vice President and Chief Executive of the Rail Division of Sea Containers, GNER's parent company.

Before this, Garnett was Regional Manager - Eastern Division for Sealink when it was a Sea Containers subsidiary, before becoming Commercial Director of Eurotunnel. He later returned to Sea Containers to lead their successful bid to operate the InterCity East Coast passenger rail franchise, which commenced as part of the privatisation of British Rail in April 1996. This seven-year contract was extended by two years in 2003, before GNER won a new contract in 2005. Garnett also presided over this deal, which saw GNER commit to paying the UK government GBP1.3 billion in premia - a record transaction for European railways. Beyond GNER, Garnett led Sea Containers' bids for other British passenger rail operations, including the South Western, South Eastern and Greater Western franchises.

Garnett left GNER towards the end of August 2006 amid growing concerns over Sea Containers' financial stability and, consequently, speculation over the future of GNER, with Sea Containers' largest shareholder Conner & Birdwell saying "[Sea Containers] will be liquidated and sold." (see Rail Magazine, 'Culture of fear' grips GNER, issue 546). This was alongside a High Court judgement rejecting GNER's application for a judicial review over Grand Central's access to the East Coast Main Line. However, his departure was apparently of his own volition, despite earlier speculation in Edinburgh Evening News that he would stand down.

He was appointed Officer of the Order of the British Empire (OBE) in the 2013 New Year Honours for services to the London 2012 Olympic and Paralympic Games.

Christopher’s late wife was Su, elder daughter of (the late) Lord and Lady Swann of Coln St Dennis.

References

Year of birth missing (living people)
British businesspeople
Officers of the Order of the British Empire
Living people
20th-century births